Sophiline Cheam Shapiro (born 1967) is a Cambodian dancer, choreographer, and educator.

Early life
At the age of eight, Shapiro was forced to live in the countryside of Cambodia after her family was evacuated from the city by the Khmer Rouge. When the Cambodia Civil War had ended, the national School of Fine Arts was reopened where Shapiro was one of the first students to learn from the masters of dance who had survived both the end of the court and the later violence of Pol Pot, who specially targeted artists. Being among the first generation of classically trained Cambodian dancers to graduate from the School of Fine Arts in Phnom Penh, Sophiline devoted herself to master the complex and intricate gestures and movements of classical Cambodian dance. Along with her husband, Sophiline launched the Khmer Arts Academy to teach a new generation of Cambodian-Americans the traditional art and culture of Cambodia.

Career

Shapiro's choreography has been credited with infusing the classical form with new ideas. In 1990, Shapiro did a classical Cambodian dance adaptation of Othello called Samrithechak (2000) (សំរឹទ្ធិចក្រ), where she used symbolism and metaphors to allude the Khmer Rouge of their guilt and denial of the crimes they committed on Cambodia. Her choreography includes The Glass Box (2002) and Seasons of Migration (2005), which she has set on Cambodia's finest performing artists and toured to three continents. Notable venues include Cal Performances, the Hong Kong Arts Festival, New York's Joyce Theater and the Venice Biennale. Pamina Devi had its world premiere at the Schönbrunn Palace Theater as part of Vienna's New Crowned Hope Festival (2006). Her collaboration with composer Chinary Ung for the Los Angeles Master Chorale, was scheduled to premiere at Walt Disney Concert Hall in November 2008. In 2013, Khmer Arts Ensemble premiered "A Bend in the River," a collaboration with sculptor Sopheap Pich and composer Him Sophy.

Shapiro received numerous honors, including Asia 21, Creative Capital, Durfee, Guggenheim and Irvine Dance Fellowships, as well as the Nikkei Asia Prize for Culture. She was a member of the first generation to train at and graduate from Phnom Penh's School of Fine Arts after the fall of Pol Pot, and she has studied dance ethnology at the undergraduate and graduate level at UCLA's Department of World Arts & Cultures. She is a recipient of a 2009 National Heritage Fellowship awarded by the National Endowment for the Arts, which is the United States government's highest honor in the folk and traditional arts. She was also named a 2009 Fellow by United States Artists.

Achievements
2006: Winner of Nikkei Asia Prize: Culture Prize

References

External links
Khmer Arts Academy Seasons of Migration (preview) vdo
Chhouy Chai vdo
Robam Makor Choreographed by Sophiline Cheam Shapiro and Chariya Burt vdo
Robam Joun Por Choreographed by Professor Sophiline Cheam Shapiro and Chariya Burt vdo

Living people
Cambodian dancers
National Heritage Fellowship winners
People from Phnom Penh
1967 births
Cambodian emigrants to the United States
University of California, Los Angeles alumni
Winners of the Nikkei Asia Prize